Nandrolone formate, also known as nandrolone carboxylate or nandrolone methanoate, as well as 19-nortestosterone 17β-formate or estr-4-en-17β-ol-3-one 17β-formate, is a synthetic, injected anabolic–androgenic steroid (AAS) and a derivative of 19-nortestosterone (nandrolone) that was never marketed. It is an androgen ester – specifically, the C17β formate ester of nandrolone.

See also
 List of androgen esters § Nandrolone esters

References

Abandoned drugs
Androgens and anabolic steroids
Formate esters
Nandrolone esters
World Anti-Doping Agency prohibited substances